Beth Chapel (also known as Doctor Midnight) is a superhero in DC Comics, and successor of the original Doctor Mid-Nite, Charles McNider.

Beth Chapel appears in Stargirl, portrayed by Anjelika Washington.

Fictional character biography
As the aging McNider spent less time in action, Beth Chapel, a medical doctor, stepped into the role of Doctor Midnight. Beth Chapel was a native of Orangeburg, South Carolina, with a pastor father, a mother who sang in the church choir, and four brothers. Chapel first appeared when Jade of Infinity, Inc. was rushed to her hospital for treatment after encountering Mister Bones' cyanide touch. During the onset of the Crisis on Infinite Earths, Beth was blinded by an oxygen explosion, only to be rescued by Hourman's son Rick Tyler, who had taken his father's Miraclo to enhance his strength. Dr. McNider performed emergency surgery on Beth, and while he couldn't restore her day vision, he did give her his ability to see in the dark. Beth and Rick assume the mantles of their predecessors as Doctor Midnight and Hourman, with her mother crafting a super hero costume from a choir robe. Along with a new Wildcat, Chapel and Tyler applied for membership in Infinity, Inc, eventually gaining admission; however, the association was short-lived, as Infinity, Inc. disbanded shortly thereafter, though Chapel and Tyler began a romantic relationship during their tenure.

Doctor Midnight and Wildcat were subsequently recruited by the U.S. government for a mission to defeat the supervillain Eclipso, only for Chapel to die on the mission along with Wildcat, the Creeper, Commander Steel, Peacemaker, and Major Victory.

During the events of the "Watchmen" sequel "Doomsday Clock", Beth Chapel was returned to life alongside the rest of the restored Justice Society of America and the Legion of Super-Heroes thanks to the influence of Doctor Manhattan. She now sports a more traditional costume resembling that of McNider and Cross. Following the fight against Black Adam's group and the foreign superheroes, Chapel is mentioned to have opened a metahuman medical clinic called the All-Star Clinic where Ronnie Raymond is receiving treatment.

Chapel as Doctor Mid-Nite is seen giving superhero medical treatment to Jon Kent after his powers fail and he is injured.

Other versions
In the new Earth-2 created in the wake of Infinite Crisis and 52, a version of Beth Chapel is shown to be a member of the Justice Society Infinity.

In other media
 Beth Chapel appears in the live-action DC Universe / The CW television series Stargirl, portrayed by Anjelika Washington. This version is a socially awkward girl who has not made any friends like her mother encourages her to do. She later obtains the original Doctor Mid-Nite, Charles McNider's, goggles, befriends its A.I., which she nicknames "Chuck", becomes the new Doctor Mid-Nite, and joins Stargirl's Justice Society of America. In season two, Chapel finds out that her parents are getting a divorce as she tries to reactivate "Chuck", only to come in contact with McNider, who is trapped in the Shadowlands. After falling victim to Eclipso's illusions, McNider advises her to keep the googles as she can see through Eclipso's tricks. Once McNider is freed, he helps Chapel find Eclipso while breaking her parents out of the villain's illusions. Following Eclipso's defeat, Chapel's parents and McNider support her in being the new Doctor Mid-Nite before Chapel helps McNider discover what happened to his family.
 Ahead of the series' premiere, Chapel made a cameo appearance in the live-action Arrowverse crossover event, "Crisis on Infinite Earths", which used archive footage from the Stargirl episode "The Justice Society".

References

External links
 Beth Chapel at DC Wiki

Characters created by Roy Thomas
Characters created by Todd McFarlane
Comics characters introduced in 1985
DC Comics female superheroes
DC Comics metahumans
African-American superheroes
Fictional characters from parallel universes
Fictional blind characters
Fictional physicians
Fictional characters from South Carolina